Saint-Jean-Baptiste is a neighbourhood of Quebec City, the capital of the province of Quebec in Canada. Located immediately West of Old Quebec, it is known for its shopping and restaurants.

Rue Saint Jean is the principal street in the district with many independent cafes, bars and specialist grocery stores. 

Along with Old Quebec, and Saint-Roch it forms the oldest part of the city. On 28 June 1845 it was the site of the Second 1845 Quebec Fire when the areas was called St. Jean.

Neighbourhoods in Quebec City